Papanasa Mudaliyar (1650–1725) was an early Carnatic music composer who lived in Tamil Nadu, India. Among his compositions mukattai kAttiya in Bhairavi ragam and nadamAdittirintha in Kambhoji ragam are well known. The latter composition is an example of the Nindastuti style in musical compositions wherein the superficial meaning of the song seems to ridicule the deity involved. Later Tyagaraja followed this in songs like Adigi sukhamu in Madhyamavathi raga.

References
 M. V. Ramana, Pre-trinity composers of Tamil Nadu - Carnatica.net

Carnatic composers
1650 births
1725 deaths